The WBSC Africas, formerly known as, African Baseball and Softball Association (ABSA), is the governing body of baseball and softball within Africa. As of June 2011, there are 24 members.

The confederation is responsible for operation of Baseball at the All-Africa Games.

History

The Africa Baseball and Softball Association (ABSA) was formed on June 8, 1990, in Lagos, Nigeria. The founding countries, 9 in number, were Angola, Botswana, Ghana, Lesotho, Namibia, Nigeria, Sierra Leone, Zambia and Zimbabwe. The executive committee unanimously appointed at the inaugural meeting included Malcolm Burne (Zimbabwe) as president, Russell Bartlett (Namibia) as 1st vice president, Ray Pitcher (Zambia) as 2nd vice president, Brigadier Ishola Williams (Nigeria) as secretary general, Lieutenant Colonel L Gwadabe (Nigeria) as assistant secretary general and Ndi Okereke-Onyiuke (Nigeria) as treasurer. The executive director of the International Baseball Association (IBA), David Osinski was present at the inaugural meeting.  The meeting was declared open by the then Minister of Sports of Nigeria, Air Commodore Anthony Ikhazoboh. 
The 1st ABSA Congress was organised in 1992 in Harare, Zimbabwe.  Thereafter 6 congresses have been held, with the 2nd held in 1993 in Cape Town, South Africa, the 3rd in 1994 in Johannesburg, South Africa, the 4th in 1995 in Harare, Zimbabwe, the 5th in 1996 in Lagos, Nigeria at which a new executive committee was elected to replace the appointed one.

This Executive Committee comprised Major General Ishola Williams (Nigeria) as president, Ray Pitcher (Zambia) as vice president baseball, Matthews Kutumela (South Africa) as vice president softball, Etienne N’Guessan (Côte d'Ivoire) as secretary general and Fridah Shiroya (Kenya) as treasurer.

Also in 1996, responsibility for the promotion and development of the games was devolved to zones, and zonal coordinators were appointed as follows: zonal chairman North Africa Zone – Mohammed Ben Guiza (Tunisia), zonal chairman East and Central Africa Zone – Solomon Gacece (Kenya), zonal coordinator West Africa Zone – Ndi Okereke-Onyiuke (Nigeria), and zonal chairman Southern Africa Zone – Edwin Bennett.

The 6th Congress was held in 2001 in Minna, Nigeria, at which Françoise Kameni Lele (Cameroon) was elected treasurer and the 7th Congress in 2006 in Nairobi, Kenya. At the 7th Congress, Major General Ishola Williams was confirmed as president, Fridah Shiroya was elected vice president softball, and Mabothobile Shebe (Lesotho) was elected secretary general.

The 1st Africa Cup Baseball Championship was organised in 1992 in Harare, Zimbabwe with only 4 countries participating with the final standings as follows: South Africa – 1st, Zimbabwe – 2nd, Nigeria – 3rd and Zambia – 4th.  The 2nd Africa Cup Baseball Championship in 1993 in Cape Town, South Africa, the 3rd Africa Cup Baseball Championship in 1995 in Harare, Zimbabwe, the 4th Africa Cup Championship in 2001 in Kampala, Uganda.  
The first time baseball featured in the All-Africa Games was in 1999 in the 7th All-Africa Games in South Africa and the second time was in 2003 in the 8th All-Africa Games in Nigeria.

The first age group baseball tournament organised by the ABSA was the 1st ABSA/KENKO Under-13 Baseball Tournament with teams from four countries participating: Kenya, Lesotho, South Africa and Zimbabwe which was won by South Africa.

The competitions organised by the ABSA now include the Africa Cup, the AA Under-15, the AAA Under-17, the Club Championship and the Little League.

Members

Baseball

Former members

 These nations were members in the IBF, but do not currently have membership in the WBSC.  Their current status within the African Baseball and Softball Association cannot be confirmed as of 2023.

Softball

Former members

WBSC World Rankings

Baseball

Softball

Baseball5

Historical leaders
Highest Ranked Africa member in the WBSC Rankings

Men's baseball

Men's softball

Women's softball

See also
World Baseball Softball Confederation
Baseball awards#Africa

References

External links
African Baseball and Softball Association
Baseball and Softball for Africa

Softball organizations
Baseball governing bodies
ABSA
Base
Sports organizations established in 1990
1990 establishments in Nigeria
Softball in Africa
Africa